In philosophy of law, law as integrity is a theory of law put forward by Ronald Dworkin. In general, it can be described as interpreting the law according to a community.

References

External links 
https://web.archive.org/web/20111001143024/http://law.queensu.ca/facultyAndStaff/facultyDirectory/walters/legalHumanismAndLawAsIntegrityPublishedEd.pdf
http://www.dailymotion.com/video/x9obxh_the-rule-of-law-as-integrity-and-th_news
http://mellenpress.com/mellenpress.cfm?bookid=834&pc=9
http://plato.stanford.edu/entries/lawphil-nature/
http://plato.stanford.edu/entries/rights/#5.1
http://theoryofjurisprudence.blogspot.com/2007/12/ronald-dworkin-law-as-integrity.html

Philosophy of law
Theories of law